Aliaksandr Makaranka (born 2 February 1990 in Orsha) is a Belarusian weightlifter. He competed for Belarus at the 2012 Summer Olympics, in the men's 94 kg division (middle heavyweight), finishing in 10th place with a snatch of 175 kg and a clean and jerk of 209 kg.

References

Belarusian male weightlifters
Weightlifters at the 2012 Summer Olympics
Olympic weightlifters of Belarus
1990 births
Living people
People from Orsha
Sportspeople from Vitebsk Region
20th-century Belarusian people
21st-century Belarusian people